Sir Thomas Robert Gardiner, GCB, GBE (8 March 1883 – 1 January 1964) was a British civil servant. 

He was Director-General of the Post Office from 1936 to 1945 and Permanent Secretary of the Ministry of Home Security from 1939 to 1940.

References 

1883 births
1964 deaths
Knights Grand Cross of the Order of the Bath
Knights Grand Cross of the Order of the British Empire
Civil servants in the General Post Office
British civil servants
People educated at the Royal High School, Edinburgh
Alumni of the University of Edinburgh